Bashkortostan, officially the Republic of Bashkortostan, also known as Bashkiria, is a republic of Russia located between the Volga and the Ural Mountains in Eastern Europe. It is the seventh-most populous federal subject in Russia and the most populous republic. Its capital and largest city is Ufa.

On 20 March 1919 it was transformed into the Bashkir ASSR, the first autonomous republic in the Russian SFSR. On 11 October 1990, it adopted the Declaration of State Sovereignty. In the Constitution of Bashkortostan and Constitution of Russia, Bashkortostan is defined as a state.

Terminology 
The name "Bashkortostan" derives from the name of the Bashkir ethnic group. While the root of the name is Turkic (being a combination of '', which in Turkish can mean head, chief, main, principal and "qort" meaning wolf, one of the animals regarded as sacred to Turkic peoples); the suffix -stan is Persian, common to many Eurasian territorial names. The Bashkirs speak the Bashkir language, which belongs to the Kipchak branch of the Turkic language group.

History 

The first settlements in the territory of modern Bashkortostan date from the early Paleolithic period, but the Bronze Age spurred an upsurge in the population of this territory. When people of the Abashevo culture started settling here, they possessed high skills in manufacturing bronze tools, weapons and decorations. They were the first to establish permanent settlements in the Southern Urals.

Bashkortostan takes its name from its native people, the Bashkirs. The Slavonic name of the country, Bashkiriya, formed at the end of the 16th century. Originally it appeared in the forms Bashkir land, Bashkir, Bashkirda and Bashkir horde. The ethnonym Bashkirs first became known in the 7th century. In the 10th century, Al-Balkhi wrote about Bashkirs as a people, divided into two groups, one of which inhabited the Southern Urals, while the other lived near the Danube River, close to the boundaries of Byzantium. His contemporary Ibn-Ruste described the Bashkirs as "an independent people, occupying territories on both sides of the Ural mountain ridge between Volga, Kama, Tobol and upstream of Yaik River".

After the early-feudal Mongolian state had broken down in the 14th century, the territory of modern Bashkortostan became divided between the Kazan and Siberia Khanates and the Nogai Horde. The tribes that lived there were headed by bi (tribal heads). After Kazan fell to Ivan the Terrible in 1554–1555, representatives of western and northwestern Bashkir tribes approached the Tsar with a request to voluntarily join Muscovy.

Starting from the second half of the 16th century, Bashkiria's territory began taking shape as a part of the Russian state. In 1798 the Spiritual Assembly of Russian Muslims was established, an indication that the tsarist government recognized the rights of Bashkirs, Tatars, and other Muslim nations to profess Islam and perform religious rituals. Ufa Governorate, with a center in Ufa, was formed in 1865—another step towards territorial identification.

After the Russian Revolution of 1917 were All-Bashkir Qoroltays (conventions) on which a decision on the need to create a national federal republic within Russia. As a result, on 28 November 1917, the Bashkir Regional (Central) Shuro (Council) proclaimed the establishment of territorial and national autonomy in areas of Orenburg, Perm, Samara, and Ufa provinces with a predominantly Bashkir population.

In December 1917, delegates to the All-Bashkir (constituent) Congress, representing the interests of the population edge of all nationalities, voted unanimously for the resolution (Farman #2) of the Bashkir regional Shuro for the proclamation of national-territorial autonomy (of the Republic) Bashkurdistan. The congress formed the government of Bashkurdistan, the Pre-parliament—Kese-Qoroltay and other bodies of power and administration, and decisions were made on how to proceed.

In March 1919, based on the agreements of the Russian Government with the Bashkir Government was formed Bashkir Autonomous Soviet Socialist Republic. During the Soviet period, Bashkiria was granted broad autonomous rights—the first among other Russian regions. The administrative structure of the Bashkir ASSR was based on principles similar to those of other autonomous republics of Russia.

On 11 October 1990, the Supreme Soviet of the Republic adopted the declaration on state sovereignty of the Bashkir ASSR. On 25 February 1992, the Bashkir ASSR was renamed the Republic of Bashkortostan.

On 31 March 1992, a Federative Compact "On separation of authorities and powers among federal organs of power of the Russian Federation and the organs of power of the Republic of Bashkortostan" was signed. On 3 August 1994, a Compact "On separation of authorities and mutual delegating of powers among the organs of power of the Russian Federation and the organs of power of the Republic of Bashkortostan" was signed, granting the republic autonomy. This agreement was abolished on 7 July 2005.

Geography 
Bashkortostan contains part of the southern Urals and the adjacent plains.

Area:  (according to the 2002 Census)
Borders: Bashkortostan borders with Perm Krai (N), Sverdlovsk Oblast (NE), Chelyabinsk Oblast (NE/E/SE), Orenburg Oblast (SE/S/SW), the Republic of Tatarstan (W), and the Udmurt Republic (NW)
Highest point: Mount Yamantau (1,638 m)
Maximum North-South distance: 550 km
Maximum East-West distance: over 430 km

Rivers 

There are over 13,000 rivers in the republic. Many rivers are part of the deepwater transportation system of European Russia; they provide access to ports of the Baltic and Black seas.

Major rivers include:
Belaya (Aghidhel) River (1,430 km)
Ufa (Qaraidel) River (918 km)
Sakmara River (760 km)
Ik (Iq) River (571 km)
Dyoma (Dim) River (556 km)
Ay River (549 km)
Yuruzan River (404 km)
Bystry Tanyp River (345 km)
Sim River (239 km)
Nugush River (235 km)
Tanalyk River (225 km)
Zilim (Yethem) River (215 km)
Syun River (209 km)

Lakes 

There are 2,700 lakes and reservoirs in the republic. Major lakes and reservoirs include:
Asylykül Lake (23.5 km2)
Qandrykül Lake (15.6 km2)
Urgun Lake (12.0 km2)
Pavlovskoye Reservoir (120.0 km2)
Nugushkoye Reservoir (25.2 km2)

Mountains 

The Republic contains part of the southern Urals, which stretch from the northern to the southern border. The highest mountains include:
Mount Yamantau (1,638 m)
Mount Bolshoy Iremel (1,582 m)
Mount Maly Iremel (1,449 m)
Mount Arwyakryaz (1,068 m)
Mount Zilmerdaq (909 m)
Mount Alataw (845 m)
Mount Yurmataw (842 m)

Natural resources 

The Republic of Bashkortostan is one of the richest territories of Russia in mineral resources with deposits of some 3,000 mineral resources. Bashkortostan is rich in crude oil reserves, and is one of the principal centers of oil extraction in the Russian Federation. Other major resources are natural gas, coal, ferrous metal ores, manganese, chromite, iron ores, non-ferrous metals ores (lead, tungsten), non-metallic ores (rock crystal, fluorite, Iceland spar, sulfide pyrites, barite, silicates, silica, asbestos, talcum), deposits of precious and semi-precious stones and natural stones (malachite, jade, granite).

The republic has enough mineral resources to provide its power and fuel complex as well as petrochemical, chemical, agro-industrial complex, ferrous and non-ferrous metallurgy, glass-making and ceramic branches with raw materials.

Bashkortostan is one of the major raw materials bases for Russia non-ferrous metallurgy. The republic has good deposits of lignite with a high degree of bitumen. This lignite can be used for obtaining a variety of different chemical products like resins, surface-active substances, gummy fertilizers, and other stimulants for plant growth. Mining-chemical raw materials (rock salt, lime, phosphorites, barytes, etc.) are quite substantial, and are utilized in the republic economy.

Bashkortostan is also rich in woods. More than one third of the republic territory is covered with woods. The following types of trees dominate: birch tree, conifers, lime, oak, and maple. The general stock of timber according to some evaluation is 717.9 million m3. Bashkortostan forests have special sanctuaries and national parks.

Bashkortostan is also rich in springs and sources of mineral, medicinal, and drinking water.

The Asselian Age at the start of the Permian Period of geological time is named after the Assel River in Bashkortostan.

Climate 
Average January temperature: 
Average July temperature:

Administrative divisions

Politics 

The head of the government of the Republic of Bashkortostan is the Head (before 1 January 2015 the title was called "President"). According to the Constitution, the Head of the Republic of Bashkortostan guarantees rights and liberties of the country's people and citizens, protects economic and political interests of the Republic of Bashkortostan, and secures legitimacy, law, and order within its territory.

Since 11 October 2018, the Head of the Republic of Bashkortostan has been Radiy Khabirov. He was first appointed as acting head by the Russian President Vladimir Putin. In 2019 he was officially elected after winning 82% of the vote in the 2019 Bashkir head election. The next election will be in 2024. Before his current role, Radiy Khabirov was the Head of Krasnogorsk, Moscow Oblast. His predecessor was Rustem Khamitov who was the leader since 19 July 2010. He resigned on 11 October 2018 ahead of the election because he personally decided to not run for re-election.

The Republic's parliament is the State Assembly—Kurultai, popularly elected every five years. The one-chamber State Assembly has 110 deputies.

The Republic's Constitution was adopted on 24 December 1993. Article 1 of the Constitution stipulates that Bashkortostan is a sovereign state within Russia, it has state power beyond the limits of authority of the Russian Federation and the powers of the Russian Federation concerning the aspect of the joint authority of the Russian Federation and the Republic of Bashkortostan. The Republic of Bashkortostan is a full-fledged subject of the Russian Federation on equal and agreed bases.

The relations of the Republic of Bashkortostan and the Russian Federation are at present based on the articles of the Constitution of the Russian Federation, the Constitution of the Republic of Bashkortostan, the Federative Treaty (with amendments) and the Agreement on Separation of authorities and powers and mutual delegating of powers among the organs of state power of the Republic of Bashkortostan.

The judicial power of the republic is in the hands of the Constitutional Court, the Supreme Court, the Court of Appeals, District Courts, and justices of the peace.

In full accord with universally recognized principles of international law, articles of the European Charter of Local Self-Government and the Constitution of the Russian Federation, the Republic of Bashkortostan ensures in its Constitution that local self-government is recognized and guaranteed within the republic's territory.

The Republic of Bashkortostan resolves all issues of administrative-territorial structure on its own. The list of districts and towns, municipalities, as well as the order of establishing, amending and changing borders of municipalities and their names, are stipulated by the Republic of Bashkortostan law "On administrative-territorial structure of the Republic of Bashkortostan and territory of municipalities".

The state has strong economic and cultural ties with its western neighbour, the Republic of Tatarstan.

Economy 

Bashkortostan is one of the most developed regions of the Russian Federation in terms of its cross regional output, the volume of industrial production, agricultural production, and investment in fixed assets.

The largest companies in the region include Bashneft (revenues of $ billion in 2017), Ufa Engine Industrial Association (part of United Engine Corporation; $ billion), Peton Holding ($ billion), Bashkhim ($ million), Ufaorgsintez ($ million), Beloretsk Iron and Steel Works ($ million).

The extraction of crude oil in Bashkiria began in 1932. At the end of 1943 large crude oil deposits were discovered. During the Great Patriotic War of 1941 to 1945, Bashkiria became one of the major regions of the Soviet Union to accommodate plants and factories evacuated from Western Russia, as well as great masses of people, while also providing the country with weaponry, fuel, and foodstuffs. After the war, a number of industries developed further in Bashkiria, such as mining (Bakr-Tay and Blyavinsky copper mines), machine-building and (especially) oil-refining. Bashkiria's industry became a solid base for the further economic growth of all European outlying territories of Russia.

The economy of Bashkortostan, being one of the largest industrial centers of Russia, is very diverse. Bashkortostan has a large agricultural sector. But the republic's most important industry is chemical processing; Bashkortostan produces more oil than any other region of Russia, about 26 million tons annually, and provides 17% of the country's gasoline and 15% of its diesel fuel. Other important products manufactured in Bashkortostan include alcohols, pesticides, and plastics.

Bashkortostan's gross regional product (GRP) in 2016 was 1.34 trillion rubles, making the republic the subject with the ninth-highest GRP in Russia. The state had a positive trade balance, with $13.7 billion exported and $1.2 billion imported in 2013. 82.9% of enterprises in Bashkortostan are profitable, higher than the nationwide average of 68.42%. Bashkortostan has been recognized as the subject with the lowest economic risk.

Bashkortostan is among the leaders in real estate development, developed electric power industry and tourism.

According to Forbes, Ufa is the best city in Russia for business among cities with a population of over one million (2013).

Structure of GRP 
GRP structure of Bashkortostan for 2013.

Tourism 

The development of tourism in Bashkortostan is regulated by the main provisions of the Program ..., regulatory and legal documents of the Russian Federation, as well as the "Concept for the development of tourist and recreational clusters in the Republic of Bashkortostan until 2030". Today, a lot of work continues to develop tourism and hospitality on the territory of the tourist and recreational cluster "North-East" of the Republic of Bashkortostan on the basis of the innovative scientific, educational and industrial infrastructure of the Geopark "Yangan-Tau". The development of tourism and hospitality is possible on the basis of a multifunctional multidisciplinary center based on the Yangan-Tau and Toratau Geoparks (figures 1, 2). The Yangan-Tau Geopark was created in Bashkiria on October 18, 2017; it is the only one among the CIS countries that is included in the UNESCO Global Geoparks network. "Toratau" was created by the decree of the head of the region in December 2018. Then the authorities announced that the Geopark could become part of the UNESCO network, and a nomination dossier is currently being prepared.

Demographics

Settlements

Population development

Vital statistics 
Source: Russian Federal State Statistics Service 

Note: Total fertility rate source.

Ethnic groups 
Bashkirs as the indigenous (autochthonal) peoples of Bashkortostan have the sole rights to self-determination. According to the 2021 Census, the ethnic composition was:
Russians 37.5%
Bashkirs 31.5%
Volga Tatars 24.2%
Mari 2.1%
Chuvash 2.0%
Udmurts 0.4%
Ukrainians 0.4%

Languages
According to the 2021 Census, spoken languages: Russian (97%), Bashkir (23%) and Tatar (20%),.

Religion

Islam is adhered to by a majority of the nation's population of Bashkir and Tatar descent. The Muslims of Bashkortostan follow the Sunni Hanafi school of Islamic law.

Most ethnic Russians, Chuvash, and Ukrainians are Orthodox Christians. Most Mari are Pagan. Non-religious people form a substantial part of any ethnic group in Bashkortostan. There are 13,000 Jews in the republic, with a historic synagogue in Ufa, and a new Jewish Community Center built in 2008.

According to the 2012 Sreda survey which interviewed 56,900 people, 58% of the population of Bashkortostan are Muslim, 17% adhere to the Russian Orthodox Church, 3% are unaffiliated generic Christians, 1% are Orthodox Christian believers without belonging to any church or members of other Orthodox churches, and 2% are adherents of the Slavic native faith (Rodnovery), the Mari native religion, Chuvash Vattisen Yaly or Tengrism. In addition, 4% of the population declare to be "spiritual but not religious", 5% are atheist, and 7% follow other religions or did not give an answer to the question. Note, however, that this survey has been criticized as biased. It was conducted by the service "Sreda", which has ties to the Christian organizations.

In 2010, there were over 1,000 mosques in Bashkortostan, 200 Orthodox churches and 60 religious buildings of other confessions.

Education 

About sixty scientific organizations are active in the republic. Fundamental and applied scientific research is underway at twelve institutes of the Russian Academy of Sciences, twenty-nine institutes of different branches of industry, as well as numerous design bureaus and organizations, universities, and colleges.

The country's system of popular education took shape over many centuries and reflects the Bashkir people's folklore, national customs, and traditions. When Islam spread in Bashkiria in the 10th century, an educational system began to emerge gradually— primarily religious schools operated under the supervision of mosques ( and madrasah).

In addition, many institutions of higher education operate in the republic, including branches of 16 leading Russian universities and colleges. Specialists graduate with degrees in about 200 trades and professions.

Education is primarily in Russian and Bashkir.

Sport 

Russian Premier League football club FC Ufa is from Ufa. KHL team Salavat Yulaev Ufa plays in the city, as does Supreme Hockey League teams Toros Neftekamsk and HC Gornyak Uchaly, Minor Hockey League team Tolpar Ufa and Russian Women's Hockey League team Agidel. Russian Volleyball Super League team Ural and volleyball team Samrau-UGNTU are from Ufa. Russian Handball Super League team Ugntu-VNZM and Russian Women's Handball Super League team Ufa-Alisa are from Ufa. Formula One driver Daniil Kvyat hails from Ufa. It was decided in 2018 to revive bandy. There are even preliminary plans for building an indoor arena.

Culture 

Bashkortostan is home to song and dance companies, a network of national theaters, museums, and libraries, and a number of annual folk festivals. The republic has seven Bashkir, four Russian, and two Tatar State Drama Theaters, a State Opera and Ballet Theater, a National Symphony Orchestra, "Bashkortostan" film studio, thirty philharmonic collectives, and the Bashkir State Folk Dance Ensemble.

The Bashkir School of Dance is well respected, with many students receiving international awards at competitions in Russia and other countries. World-renowned ballet dancer Rudolf Nureyev, as a child, was encouraged to dance in Bashkir folk performances, and began his dancing career in Ufa.

Bashkir literature is the literary tradition of the Republic of Bashkortostan.

There are many museums in the Republic where you can get acquainted with the history of the region. The National Museum of the Republic of Bashkortostan, the Bashkir Nesterov Art Museum, the Museum of Archeology and Ethnography are the largest of them.

See also 
 Bashkir cuisine 
 Shonqar

Notes

References

Further reading

External links 

 The centralized portal of the authorities of the Republic of Bashkortostan  
 The Head of Republic of Bashkortostan

 
States and territories established in 1917
Russian-speaking countries and territories
1917 establishments in Europe
Members of the Unrepresented Nations and Peoples Organization
Regions of Europe with multiple official languages
Observer members of the International Organization of Turkic Culture